Mojoworld can have at least three meanings:

 MojoWorld Generator was a fractal landscape generator created by Pandromeda, Inc.;
 Mojoworld, or Mojo World, is the home planet of Mojo, a Marvel Comics supervillain.
 Mojoworld is the name of Mojo Nixon's "amusement park of my mind," as described in his cover of the song, This Land is Your Land from the album Root Hog or Die.